The Apalachicola National Estuarine Research Reserve, located in the U.S. state of Florida, protects the  biological diversity of the Apalachicola Bay as well as the economic value of the natural resources and pristine conditions.

Between 60% and 85% of the local population make their living directly from the fishing industry, most of which is done in reserve waters. Seafood landings from the Apalachicola Reserve are worth $14–16 million dockside annually. At the consumer level, this represents a $900–$800 million industry.

Research projects that target commercial fisheries management and the food chain are a high priority in the Apalachicola Reserve. In addition to its water quality monitoring program, the reserve has engaged in extensive benthic habitat mapping in Apalachicola Bay and has a highly sophisticated geographic information systems (GIS), which is used to educate coastal managers and visiting researchers about the area and its ecology.

Other educational offerings include ongoing guest lectures for the community and coastal management workshops for environmental professionals. The reserve's K-12 educational activities are divided between classroom and on-site programs.

References

Apalachicola National Estuarine Research Reserve
Apalachicola National Estuarine Research Reserve - Florida Dept. of Environmental Protection

Protected areas of Florida
National Estuarine Research Reserves of the United States
Protected areas of Franklin County, Florida
Protected areas of Gulf County, Florida
Protected areas of Liberty County, Florida
National Estuarine Research Reserves of Florida
Landforms of Franklin County, Florida
Landforms of Gulf County, Florida
Landforms of Liberty County, Florida